Mission East is a Danish relief and development NGO that aims to help vulnerable people in Eastern Europe, the Middle East and Asia and support local communities' capacity to organize and help themselves through activities ranging from emergency relief during disasters to long-term development aid. Many of the countries where Mission East has programmes are considered ‘fragile’ contexts, where Mission East works in the humanitarian-development nexus. The organization also focuses on the strengthening of  rights for marginalized groups, including women and people with disabilities, and their inclusion in society. Mission East implements projects both directly and together with local and international partners to strengthen the relevance, impact and sustainability of the programs. Mission East has offices in Afghanistan, Armenia, Iraq, Lebanon, Myanmar, Nepal, North Korea, Syria and Tajikistan.

Mission East was founded in 1991 by Rene Hartzner  and his son Dr. Kim Hartzner, who was managing director of the organization until July 2020.

Mission East is headquartered in Hellerup, Denmark and in Brussels, Belgium.

2021 New Managing Director 
On January 1, 2021, Mission East welcomed a new managing director. Betina Gollander-Jensen comes from a position as international manager in Caritas Denmark and has a long career in the development and emergency aid. Betina Gollander-Jensen has a bachelor's degree in Danish from the University of Copenhagen and a master's degree in International Studies and Social Science from Roskilde University. She was seconded by the United Nations High Commissioner for Refugees (UNHCR) to South Africa, Uganda and Sudan and by the Danish Ministry of Foreign Affairs as a senior advisor to the Danish Embassy and to the Kenyan Ministry of Refugees.

2020 Restructuring 
In June 2020, the organization underwent a restructuring that involved Secretary-General Kim Hartzner being dismissed due to disagreements between management and the board. At the organization's general meeting on June 21, 2020, a vote of no confidence was cast for the board due to Kim Hartzner's dismissal. A new board was elected and Kim Hartzner re-appointed by the new board. In early July 2020, Kim Hartzner chose to resign from his position as general secretary in order to instead assume a role as founder and fundraiser for the organization on a consulting basis. On 1 January 2021, Betina Gollander-Jensen took over as the new managing director of Mission East. Following an independent study of Mission East conducted by Deloitte in February 2021, the organization is changing its accounting policies, which will be reflected in Mission East's accounts for 2020.

Sectoral Expertise 
Mission East focuses on:
Rural community development
Disaster Response
Core sectors of operation are:
 Water, sanitation and hygiene (WASH)
 Food security
 Livelihoods
 Disability and Inclusion
 Disaster Risk Reduction

Institutional Funding 
 Danish Ministry of Foreign Affairs 
 Danish Mission Council Development Department
 CISU (Civil Society in Development)
 ECHO (The commission's European Community Humanitarian Office)
 EuropeAid
 German Ministry of Foreign Affairs
 Norwegian Ministry of Foreign Affairs
 FAO (Food and Agriculture Organization)
 UNDP (United Nations Development Programme)
 UNOCHA (UN Office for Coordination of Humanitarian Aid)
 PATRIP

Accreditations 
 CHS (Core Humanitarian Standard) – certified compliant since 2017
 SPHERE (Humanitarian Charter & Minimum Standards in Disaster Response)
 Red Cross Code of Conduct
 ECHO FPA (European Commission Humanitarian Aid Department's Framework Partnership Agreement)

Affiliations 
 EU-CORD
 Danish Mission Council Development Department
 CISU
 VOICE
 ISOBRO
 CONCORD
 Globalt Fokus 
 Integral Alliance
Mission East official website in English

Development charities based in Denmark